Ann Way (14 November 1915 – 13 March 1993) was an English film and television character actress. Born in Wiveliscombe, Somerset, she began her career in repertory in Birmingham in the 1950s moving from there to the Dundee Rep.

Her petite build and deep-set eyes saw her frequently typecast as a stereotypically dotty or timid and mouse-like spinster. She nonetheless appeared in a wide range of roles, including the television series Dr Finlay's Casebook, Emmerdale Farm where she played an aunt of publican and newspaper correspondent Amos Brearly, Fawlty Towers (where she memorably played the Colonel's wife inadvertently served the raw red mullet in "Gourmet Night") and Rumpole of the Bailey as Dodo Mackintosh. She played the vicar's wife in Last of the Summer Wine. She also read the Mrs. Pepperpot books on the children's series Jackanory.

Film roles included Carry On Loving (1970), Endless Night (1972) and Clockwise (1986) (in which she sang the Vivian Ellis standard This is my Lovely Day on the soundtrack and made comic use of the repeated line "Aren't we all such lucky people") and The Prime of Miss Jean Brodie (1969) (where she played the headmistress's secretary, Miss Gaunt). A more unusual role was the 1987 short film Unusual Ground Floor Conversion in which she played an old lady gradually driving her downstairs neighbour mad by throwing water out of her window every few minutes.

Way died in London, England on 13 March 1993.

Selected filmography
The Belles of St. Trinian's (1954) – Sixth Former (uncredited)
The Hands of Orlac (1960) – Seamstress (uncredited)
The Prime of Miss Jean Brodie (1969) – Miss Gaunt
Twinky (1970) – School Miss-tress
Carry On Loving (1970) – Aunt Victoria Grubb
Hands of the Ripper (1971) – Seamstress (uncredited)
Follow Me! (1972) – Cinema box-office attendant (uncredited)
Endless Night (1972) – Mrs. Dorothy Philpott
Jabberwocky (1977) – Merchant's Wife (uncredited)
The Sailor's Return (1978) – Mrs. Clall
Little Lord Fauntleroy (1980) – Miss Smiff
Bullshot (1983) – Hotel Guest
The Dresser (1983) – Miss White
Brazil (1985) – Old Lady with Dog
Clockwise (1986) – Mrs. Way
Haunted Honeymoon (1986) – Rachel
Crystalstone (1987) – Housekeeper
The Dawning (1988) – George Brabazon
Killing Dad or How to Love Your Mother (1990) – Margot
How's Business (1991) – Miss Jolly
Once Upon a Crime (1992) – Housekeeper
Anchoress (1993) – Alice (final film role)

References

External links

1915 births
1993 deaths
English film actresses
English television actresses
People from Wiveliscombe
20th-century English actresses
20th-century British businesspeople